The Sky Towers Multifunctional Complex is a mixed-use building currently on hold in Kyiv, the capital of Ukraine. The project is designed to have two towers, ranging from 34 to 47 stories, and a two-story bank building. The gross area of the complex will be approximately 225,000 square meters. The project is also designed to have an eight-story underground parking area of approximately 51,630 square meters with 841 parking spaces. Around 1,594 square meters will be allocated for a retail area. Once completed, the 47-story office tower will be the tallest building in Ukraine.

History
The project of building a skyscraper next to Kyiv's Central Civil Registry Office was originally proposed in 2005, named ZAGS after a Russian abbreviation for civil registry office. Kyiv Donbass Development Group was an original developer for this project, while the official owner of the land was Ahentsiia Ofisnoho Budivnytstva (Office Construction Agency). The building was planned to be triangle-shaped, similar to Ministry of Transport building, that was on the opposite side of the street. Construction was planned to end in 2012, also there was a plan of opening a hotel in the tower.

Site cleanup began in March 2006. The final project was published in October, it was made by DLN bureau from Hong Kong and adapted for Ukraine by Vitaliy Vasyagin and his Vivas bureau. Later, the building was named 'Sky Towers'. In 2008 slurry wall were installed. Preparation for foundation pit began in 2009. In April 2010 construction of eight underground floors had started. The construction process went very slow, with pauses due to financial difficulties.

In October the Turkish company Ant Yapi became the project's main contractor. In October 2011 construction of zero floor began. 24 October the underground floors were finished and preparation for the first floor construction had started.

In May 2012 an American company, called Cimbrorum Holdings LLC bought the project, KDD Group took a credit from Ukreximbank to build the skyscraper. Also planned hotel inside the lower tower was cancelled.

In November the Tower A's first floor construction began, next month Tower B's zero floor was complete. In January 2013 the building rose above one floor and started 'growing' quickly. In May Tower A had ten floors and Tower B had seven. In June both towers reached 11 floors, which was a limit in Ant Yapi's contract, so construction was stopped for some time. In July the construction continued, since August both towers were being constructed concurrently. The building reached 15 floors in October and 20 in December. In January 2014 first glass was installed on facade of the Tower A.

After the revolution in Ukraine construction slightly slowed down. In March the building had 23 floors and was already taller than 100 meters. At the end of the month the building already had 25 floors. A glass facade was installed on Tower B, first escalators were set in the atrium. In April glass installation began on both towers. In the end of the month atrium's construction began, it was finished in May. Next month there were 27 floors ready and glass installation was ongoing. Next month construction of new floors was stopped, but the glass installation got accelerated. During July–August almost a half of the building already had glass installed.

2 August 2015 KDD Group, building's developer, went bankrupt, being unable to pay all the debts to Ukreximbank. For the rest of the year the work continued only on the facade and went very slow. 13 January 2016 the work on dismantling one of cranes began. By February both cranes were removed and the construction was put on hold.

Since 2017 there were plans to situate all the Kyiv City Administration in one building and the Sky Towers was one of the variants. In 2018 Kyiv Investment Agency's director Oleh Mistiuk stated, that they've reached the final stage in the negotiations about financing the building construction and need a contract from the government. However these plans didn't go any further.

In 2021 Ukreximbank decided to sell Sky Towers from auction for ₴7 billion.

Accidents and controversies 
16 September 2010 illegal workers from Turkey, Uzbekistan, Kyrgyzstan and Kazakhstan, that were building the skyscraper were arrested.

17 February 2014 a 1.5 m long metal rod flew off the construction site and struck a car, as a result it pierced the roof and one passenger got minor injuries.

Gallery

See also
 List of tallest buildings in Ukraine
 List of tallest buildings in Europe

References

Buildings and structures in Kyiv
Skyscrapers in Ukraine
Economy of Kyiv
Prospect Beresteiskyi